Paulė Kuzmickienė (born 30 April 1978 in Utena) is a Lithuanian politician, a Member of the Seimas for Žirmūnai constituency. Previous she was a member of  Vilnius City Municipal Council.

Biography 
In 2005 Kuzmickienė graduated from Lithuanian University of Educational Sciences. She holds a master's degree of Social Sciences (Education Management).

She was an adviser to the Prime Minister on the development of the Vilnius region.

Kuzmickienė is member of the Homeland Union - Lithuanian Christian Democrats. From 2011 to 2019 she was member of  Vilnius City Municipal Council.

Elected as Member of the Seimas for Žirmūnai constituency since September 2019.

References

1978 births
Living people
Members of the Seimas
Homeland Union politicians
People from Utena
21st-century Lithuanian politicians
Lithuanian University of Educational Sciences alumni
Women members of the Seimas